NGC 389 is a lenticular galaxy located approximately 239 million light-years from the Solar System in the constellation Andromeda. It was discovered on September 6, 1885 by Lewis Swift. It was described by Dreyer as "extremely faint, extremely small, round, star near."

See also 
 Spiral galaxy 
 List of NGC objects (1–1000)
 Pisces (constellation)

References

External links 
 
 SEDS

0389
18850906
Andromeda (constellation)
Discoveries by Lewis Swift
Lenticular galaxies
004054